Fraipontite is a zinc aluminium silicate mineral with a formula of .  

It is a member of the kaolinite-serpentine mineral group and occurs as an oxidation product of zinc deposits. It occurs with smithsonite, gebhardite, willemite, cerussite and sauconite.

It was first described in 1927 for an occurrence in Vieille Montagne, Verviers, Liège Province, Belgium. It was named for Julien Jean Joseph Fraipont (1857–1910), and Charles de Fraipont, geologists of Liege, Belgium. In addition to the type locality in Belgium, it has been reported from Tsumeb, Namibia; Laurium, Greece; Swaledale, North Yorkshire, England; the Silver Bill mine, Cochise County, Arizona, the Blanchard Mine, Socorro County, New Mexico and the Mohawk mine, San Bernardino County, California in the US; and from the Ojuela mine, Mapimi, Durango, Mexico.

A synonym of the fraipontite is the zinalsite, which was reported in 1956 for an occurrence in Kazakhstan.

References

External links

Zinc minerals
Aluminium minerals
Phyllosilicates
Monoclinic minerals
Minerals in space group 8
Minerals described in 1927